Scaevola densifolia is a species of flowering plant in the family Goodeniaceae. It is a small, spreading shrub with fan-shaped cream or white flowers and is endemic to Western Australia.

Description
The flowers are borne in racemes at the end of branches, bracts leaf like.

Taxonomy and naming
Scaevola densifolia was first formally described in 1990 by Roger Charles Carolin and the description was published in Telopea. The specific epithet (densifolia)  means "thick" and "crowded" referring to the leaves.

Distribution and habitat
This scaevola grows in heath between the Oldfield and Fitzgerald Rivers in Western Australia.

References

 

densifolia
Flora of Western Australia